Milas Museum is a museum of archaeology and ethnography in Muğla Province of Turkey.

It was established in 1987. The museum is in a two-story building with a  yard. Most of the exhibited items are from Stratonicea, Iasos, Damlıboğaz (Hydai), and Beçin. The number of exhibited items are 3,025 archaeological items, 164 ethnographic items and 1,174 coins.

Gallery

References

Archaeological museums in Turkey
Tourist attractions in Muğla Province
Milas District
Museums established in 1987
1987 establishments in Turkey